Choragus is a genus of fungus weevils in the family of beetles known as Anthribidae. There are at least 60 described species in Choragus.

Species
These 62 species belong to the genus Choragus:

 Choragus angustelineatus Frieser, 1978 c
 Choragus anobioides Sharp, 1891 c
 Choragus anonymus Frieser, R., 1994 c g
 Choragus arcuatus Frieser, 1983 c g
 Choragus aureolineatus Abeille, 1893 g
 Choragus aurolineatus Abeille, 1893 c
 Choragus bolus Jordan, 1914 c
 Choragus bostrychoides Mull. in Germ., 1821 c
 Choragus breviclava Frieser, 1983 c g
 Choragus brevior Frieser, 1981 c g
 Choragus caucasicus Motsch., 1873 c
 Choragus cissoides Sharp, 1891 c
 Choragus compactus Sharp, 1891 c
 Choragus costulatus Frieser, R., 2001 c g
 Choragus cryphaloides Sharp, 1891 c
 Choragus cryptocephalus Sharp, 1891 c
 Choragus cylindricollis Frieser, R., 2004 c g
 Choragus dentipes Frieser, 1981 c g
 Choragus distendens Frieser, 1981 g
 Choragus ebeninus Frieser, R., 2000 c g
 Choragus excavatus Frieser, 1983 c g
 Choragus exophthalmus Valentine, 1998 i g
 Choragus faucium Jordan, 1937 c
 Choragus fictilis Scudder, S.H., 1890 c g
 Choragus flavofasciatus Frieser, R., 2004 c g
 Choragus fulvescens Frieser, R., 2004 c g
 Choragus galeazzii Wolfrum, 1953 c
 Choragus globuliformis Frieser, R., 2001 c g
 Choragus grandicollis Frieser, R., 2001 c g
 Choragus granulipennis Frieser, 1983 c g
 Choragus grenieri Bris., 1867 c
 Choragus harrisi LeConte, 1878 i c
 Choragus horni Wolfrum, 1930 c
 Choragus interruptofasciatus Frieser, R., 2004 c g
 Choragus kuehbandneri Frieser, 1980 g
 Choragus major Valentine, 1998 i g
 Choragus malus Johraku, 1953 c
 Choragus mimetes Wolfrum, 1960 c
 Choragus monticulatus Frieser, R., 2001 c g
 Choragus mundulus Sharp, 1891 c
 Choragus nepalicus Frieser, R., 2001 c g
 Choragus niger Stephens, 1830 c
 Choragus nitens Lec., 1885 c
 Choragus nitidipennis Gerh., 1901 c
 Choragus ornatus Jordan, 1914 c
 Choragus othiodes Frieser, R., 2004 c g
 Choragus piceus Schaum, 1845 c
 Choragus productus Wolfrum, 1960 c
 Choragus pygmaeus Robert in Guer., 1832 c
 Choragus rogei Frieser, R., 2002 c g
 Choragus sayi LeConte, 1876 i c b
 Choragus sheppardi Kirby, 1818 c
 Choragus spadiceus Frieser, R., 2000 c g
 Choragus strigosus Frieser, 1980 g
 Choragus striolatus Valentine, 1998 i g
 Choragus subsulcatus Rey, 1893 c
 Choragus tertiarius Heyden, C. von & Heyden, L. von., 1866 c g
 Choragus theryi Abeille, 1893 c
 Choragus velutinus Johraku, 1953 c
 Choragus vinsoni Jordan, 1937 c
 Choragus vittatus Reitter, 1885 c
 Choragus zimmermanni LeConte, 1876 i c b

Data sources: i = ITIS, c = Catalogue of Life, g = GBIF, b = Bugguide.net

References

Further reading

External links

 

Anthribidae
Articles created by Qbugbot
Beetle genera